Organic & Biomolecular Chemistry is a weekly peer-reviewed scientific journal covering all aspects of organic chemistry, including organic aspects of chemical biology, medicinal chemistry, natural product chemistry, supramolecular chemistry, macromolecular chemistry, theoretical chemistry, and catalysis. It is published by the Royal Society of Chemistry. Its predecessor journals were Perkin Transactions I and Perkin Transactions II. The Executive Editor is Richard Kelly.

Abstracting and indexing 
The journal is abstracted and indexed in:
 Chemical Abstracts Service
 Index Medicus/MEDLINE/PubMed
 Science Citation Index
 Current Contents/Life Sciences
 Current Contents/Physical, Chemical & Earth Sciences
 Scopus
According to the Journal Citation Reports, the journal has a 2016 impact factor of 3.564.

See also 
Natural Product Reports
MedChemComm
 List of scientific journals
 List of scientific journals in chemistry

References

External links 
 

Biochemistry journals
Publications established in 2003
Royal Society of Chemistry academic journals
Biweekly journals
English-language journals